"A Little Cloud" is a short story by James Joyce, first published in his 1914 collection, Dubliners. It contrasts the life of the protagonist, Little Chandler, a Dubliner who remained in the city and married, with the life of his old friend Ignatius Gallaher, who had left Ireland to find success and excitement as a journalist and bachelor in London.

Introduction
In the short story "A Little Cloud" by James Joyce, the protagonist, Little Chandler, begins the narrative at his office job in Dublin. He excitedly thinks about his old friend Ignatius Gallaher who he is to meet at a bar upon leaving work. Gallaher has become a moderately successful journalist abroad in England and when Chandler arrives at the bar, he sees that this position has had an influence on his friend. After sharing drinks and cigars, the two men separate and Chandler heads home thinking about his life compared to Gallaher's. This leads him down a largely negative train of thought which climaxes when he returns home. He sees, but cannot console his crying infant and the contempt his wife holds for him is clear enough. This makes Chandler believe that he has, to an extent, wasted his life and he succumbs to sorrow and remorse. This story has often been read to represent aspects of the political struggle between England and Ireland at the time as well.

Summary
The story follows Thomas Chandler, or "Little Chandler" as he is known, through a portion of his day.  The story drops the reader into Little Chandler's life when he is at work, where he cannot focus because he is preoccupied with the thought of a visit later that day. He anxiously awaits this visit with his old friend Ignatius Gallaher. Gallaher is now a "brilliant figure" in the London Press and Little Chandler has not seen him in eight years. As Little Chandler thinks about his old friend and the success that has come to him, he begins to reflect upon his own life. This reflection gives the reader insight to Little Chandler's character. The reader sees Little Chandler as a mere observer of life, a reluctant character.  He is timid, because he enjoys poetry yet is too "shy" to read it to his wife.
 
Little Chandler likes to think that he himself could have been a writer if only he had put his mind to it. All of the "different moods and impressions he wished to express in verse" could still be achieved if he could just express himself. But as much as Little Chandler covers up his true feelings with these thoughts that seem to "comfort" him, the reader can see past this.

These feelings are more clearly exposed to the reader in the bar where Little Chandler actually meets Gallaher. Here, Gallaher tells enchanting stories of his vast traveling. His life is the exact opposite of Little Chandler's and Little Chandler begins to feel that his wife is holding him back from success as a result of Gallaher's glorification of his travels and freedoms. Without his wife, without his little boy, he would be free to prosper. Deep envy sets into Little Chandler. It seems as though the more they drink, and the longer they talk, the more inferior Chandler feels. Still, he tries to hide his envy of Gallaher's life by saying how one day Gallaher will get married and start a family too.

Joyce shifts the scene to Little Chandler's home. We find Little Chandler with his child in his arms. He is sitting at a table looking at a picture of his wife, Annie. He looks into her eyes searching for answers to his now confused state of mind. All he finds is coldness. He sees a pretty girl, but he can see no life in her, and he compares her unfavourably to the rich, exotic women Gallaher says are available to him. He wonders why he married Annie. He then opens a book of Byron's poetry and begins to read until the child begins to cry and Little Chandler finds he cannot comfort him. Little Chandler snaps at his son. The frightened baby cries harder and harder until Annie comes. Through her interaction with Little Chandler and the child, it becomes apparent that Little Chandler is not her main priority.

Little Chandler feels trapped. All feelings of hope that existed at the beginning of the day are now gone. It is at this moment that Little Chandler reaches a deep moment of recognition.  He finally sees the truth that the reader has known all along. His own reluctance is the only thing responsible for his feelings of incompleteness, and he can now only blame himself.  Tears come to Little Chandler's eyes, and the story is cut off.

Analysis

In an analysis of "A Little Cloud", Harold Mosher wrote that, in Dubliners, Joyce uses, and perhaps abuses, both repetition and cliché in order to give the writing a feel of insignificance. He pointed out there is a legitimate lack of action in many of the stories, certainly in "A Little Cloud", and this "content of lack" is mirrored by the language Joyce used. Mosher believes the talking about nothing, in the way that many Joyce characters do, is actually rather important, and argued that, in terms of the language, this style actually portrays an abundance of creativity and quality, rather than the lack of fresh thought that could be implied by the cliché nature of the writing. Thematically, Mosher said this is important in an ironic way, because, though it shows creativity on the part of Joyce, it shows little on the part of Chandler: he thinks and speaks in this way because, as he says in the end to Annie, he "couldn’t... didn't do anything."

Title
Thomas O'Grady's has argued that the somewhat ambiguous title "A Little Cloud" can be attributed to William Blake's "Infant Sorrow." He points out that Blake was an influential artist for Joyce and that Joyce gave a lecture on Blake once. O'Grady believes this connection is logical, because it lends structural and thematic significance to the title. This story is Little Chandler's "song of experience" according to O'Grady because the "infant hope" carried by Chandler's child is overwhelmed with the sorrow and remorse he feels.

Terence Brown, meanwhile, has suggested the title may be an allusion to the Biblical tale of Elijah and the prophets of Baal and, more particularly, to I Kings 18:44.

References

Citations

Sources

External links
 
Full Text

Short stories by James Joyce
1914 short stories